VG-10 is a cutlery grade stainless steel produced in Japan. The name stands for V Gold 10 ("gold" meaning quality), or sometimes V-Kin-10 (V金10号) (kin means "gold" in Japanese). It is a stainless steel with a high carbon content containing 1% Carbon, 15% Chromium, 1% Molybdenum, 0.2% Vanadium, and 1.5% Cobalt.

The VG-10 stainless steel was originally designed by Takefu Special Steel Co. Ltd., based in Takefu, Fukui Prefecture, Japan (the former cutlery/sword-making center of Echizen). Takefu also made another version: VG10W, which contains 0.4% tungsten. Almost all VG-10 steel knife blades were manufactured in Japan. 
 
VG-10 was originally aimed at Japanese chefs, but also found its way into sports cutlery viz. Spyderco and Kizer have produced some of their most popular models from VG-10, SOG categorizes VG-10 as its highest grade of blade steel, and Fällkniven uses laminated VG-10 in many of their knives.

References

External links
 http://www.e-tokko.com/eng_vg10.htm
 What is VG-10 Steel? is VG-10 Steel Good for Knives? 

Stainless steel
Steel alloys